Josey Wales  (born Joseph Winston Sterling, October 9, 1956, in St. Mary, Jamaica) is a Jamaican dancehall deejay. He has been called, along with Brigadier Jerry, Yellowman and sound system partner Charlie Chaplin, one of the best Jamaican dancehall deejays of the 1980s. Wales is named after the 1976 Western movie character from The Outlaw Josey Wales, played by Clint Eastwood, and subsequently nicknamed "The Outlaw".

His career began in the late 1970s, first starting as a deejay on the Roots Unlimited sound-system where he often sparred with Burro Banton, and later performing over U-Roy-owned King Sturgav sound system. He gained even more popularity in the early 1980s performing over Henry "Junjo" Lawes's Volcano sound system, and recording singles such as "Bobo Dread" and "Leggo Mi Hand" for Lawes' label of the same name, as well as later hits for George Phang's Power House label, most noticeably "Undercover Lover".

He was shot and robbed in a Kingston bar in 1997, an incident that he dealt with in the country and western song "Bushwacked". He survived the robbery, and after his discharge from a hospital, he went to the United States and bought an ambulance to donate for the Kingston Public Hospital.

He appeared in Shaggy's "Bad Man Don't Cry" video, and by 2014 had begun recording new material.

In October 2017, he was awarded the Order of Distinction by the Jamaican government.

Personal life
Josey is a Rastafarian and has been since 1975 but also retains a major influence of Christianity. He was baptized in May 1958. He currently resides in Kingston.

Discography
This discography is incomplete; you can help by adding missing albums/singles.

Albums
 1983 – Josie Wales Meets Early-B
 1983 – Outlaw, also called The Outlaw Josey Wales
 1983 – King Yellowman Meets The Mighty Josey Wales 
 1984 – No Way No Better Than Yard
 1984 – Two Giants Clash (split with Yellowman)
 1985 – Undercover Lover
 1986 – Rules, also called Ruling
 1986 – Ha Fi Say So
 1988 – Special Prayer
 1988 – Na Lef Jamaica
 1989 – How Yu Mouth Tan So
 1994 – Outlaw (reissue)
 1994 – Charlie Chaplin and Josey Wales – Kings Of The Dancehall
 1994 – Cowboy Style
 2001 – Rulin (reissue)
 2015 –  "Loving Pauper" w/ Sista Sensi

Notes

References

External links
 [ Biography] at Allmusic

Jamaican male singers
Jamaican dancehall musicians
Living people
People from Saint Mary Parish, Jamaica
1958 births
Greensleeves Records artists